Jackie Guerra is an actress best known for being the star of the short-lived sitcom First Time Out. She also co-starred in the PBS series, American Family in addition to co-starring roles in feature films, including a role as Selena Quintanilla’s drum playing sister Suzette Quintanilla in the Warner Bros. biopic Selena and opposite Woody Allen in Picking Up the Pieces.

Her autobiography, Under Construction, was published in January 2006.

Filmography

Film

Television

Other

References
http://conference2014.diversitywoman.com/Jackie-Guerra/

External links
 

Hispanic and Latino American actresses
American television actresses
American actresses of Mexican descent
Living people
Place of birth missing (living people)
Year of birth missing (living people)
21st-century American women